The 2022 Chicago Marathon was the 44th edition of the annual marathon race in Chicago, held on Sunday, .  An Elite Platinum Label marathon, it was the third of four World Marathon Majors events to be held over the span of six weeks.  More than 40,000 runners were expected to take part in the event.

Competitors 

Seifu Tura of Ethiopia, the winner of the previous year's race, is expected to return to defend his title.  His compatriot Herpasa Negasa, who ran a marathon with a time of 2:03:40 in Dubai in 2019, is expected to join him.  Also expected to make an appearance are Kenyan runners Bernard Koech and Elisha Rotich.

Kenyan runner Ruth Chepng'etich, the defending champion, is the favorite to win the women's race.  Also scheduled to join the field are Ethiopian runners Ruti Aga and Haven Hailu Desse, and Kenyan runners Celestine Chepchirchir and Vivian Kiplagat.

U.S. wheelchair athlete Tatyana McFadden, who has previously won the Chicago Marathon nine times, is also expected to defend her title.

Results
Results for the top ten in the running races and top three in the wheelchair races are listed below.

Notes

References

External links 
 Official site
 Official Results

Marathon
2022 in sports in Illinois
2022 marathons
2022
October 2022 sports events in the United States